David John Little KC (d. 16 April 1984) was an Ulster Unionist Party politician in the Parliament of Northern Ireland, a barrister and county court judge.

Little was the son of Rev. Dr. James Little, erstwhile MP for County Down, and educated at Royal Belfast Academical Institution, St. Andrew's College, Dublin and later at Trinity College Dublin, where he graduated MA and LL.B.  He was called to the Bar of Northern Ireland in 1938 and to the Inner Bar in 1963.

In 1959 he was elected to the Stormont Parliament for West Down, a seat he held until 1965.  On his retirement from  Parliament, he was appointed Recorder of Londonderry (1965–1979) and then a Judge for North Antrim Division (1979); he retired in 1980.

References

Biographies of Members of the Northern Ireland House of Commons 

Year of birth missing
1984 deaths
Members of the House of Commons of Northern Ireland 1958–1962
Members of the House of Commons of Northern Ireland 1962–1965
Ulster Unionist Party members of the House of Commons of Northern Ireland
People educated at the Royal Belfast Academical Institution
Place of birth missing
Northern Ireland King's Counsel
Members of the House of Commons of Northern Ireland for County Down constituencies